Steven Arthur Pinker (born September 18, 1954) is a Canadian-American cognitive psychologist, psycholinguist, popular science author, and public intellectual. He is an advocate of evolutionary psychology and the computational theory of mind.

Pinker is the Johnstone Family Professor of Psychology at Harvard University, and his academic specializations are visual cognition and developmental linguistics. His experimental subjects include mental imagery, shape recognition, visual attention, children's language development, regular and irregular phenomena in language, the neural bases of words and grammar, as well as the psychology of cooperation and communication, including euphemism, innuendo, emotional expression, and common knowledge. He has written two technical books that proposed a general theory of language acquisition and applied it to children's learning of verbs. In particular, his work with Alan Prince published in 1989 critiqued the connectionist model of how children acquire the past tense of English verbs, positing that children use default rules, such as adding -ed to make regular forms, sometimes in error, but are obliged to learn irregular forms one by one.

Pinker is the author of nine books for general audiences. The Language Instinct (1994), How the Mind Works (1997), Words and Rules (2000), The Blank Slate (2002), and The Stuff of Thought (2007) describe aspects of psycholinguistics and cognitive science, and include accounts of his own research, positing that language is an innate behavior shaped by natural selection and adapted to our communication needs. Pinker's The Sense of Style (2014) is a general language-oriented style guide. Pinker's book The Better Angels of Our Nature (2011) posits that violence in human societies has generally declined over time, and identifies six major trends and five historical forces of this decline, the most important being the humanitarian revolution brought by the Enlightenment and its associated cultivation of reason. Enlightenment Now (2018) further argues that the human condition has generally improved over recent history because of reason, science and humanism. The nature and importance of reason is also discussed in his next book Rationality: What It Is, Why It Seems Scarce, Why It Matters (2021).

In 2004, Pinker was named in Times "The 100 Most Influential People in the World Today", and in the years 2005, 2008, 2010, and 2011 in Foreign Policys list of "Top 100 Global Thinkers". Pinker was also included in Prospect Magazine's top 10 "World Thinkers" in 2013. He has won awards from the American Psychological Association, the National Academy of Sciences, the Royal Institution, the Cognitive Neuroscience Society, and the American Humanist Association. He delivered the Gifford Lectures at the University of Edinburgh in 2013. He has served on the editorial boards of a variety of journals, and on the advisory boards of several institutions. Pinker was the chair of the Usage Panel of the American Heritage Dictionary from 2008 to 2018.

Biography
Pinker was born in Montreal, Quebec, in 1954, to a middle-class Jewish family. His grandparents emigrated to Canada from Poland and Romania in 1926, and owned a small necktie factory in Montreal. His father was a lawyer. His mother eventually became a high-school vice-principal. His brother is a policy analyst for the Canadian government, while his sister, Susan Pinker, is a psychologist and writer who authored The Sexual Paradox and The Village Effect.

Pinker graduated from Dawson College in 1973. He graduated from McGill University in 1976 with a Bachelor of Arts in psychology, then did doctoral studies in experimental psychology at Harvard University under Stephen Kosslyn, receiving a PhD in 1979. He did research at the Massachusetts Institute of Technology for a year, then became a professor at Harvard and then Stanford University.

From 1982 until 2003 Pinker taught at the Department of Brain and Cognitive Sciences at MIT, was the co-director of the Center for Cognitive Science (1985–1994), and eventually became the director of the Center for Cognitive Neuroscience (1994–1999), taking a one-year sabbatical at the University of California, Santa Barbara, in 1995–96. Since 2003 he has been serving as the Johnstone Family Professor of Psychology at Harvard and between 2008 and 2013 he also held the title of Harvard College Professor in recognition of his dedication to teaching. He currently gives lectures as a visiting professor at the New College of the Humanities, a private college in London.

Pinker married Nancy Etcoff in 1980 and they divorced in 1992; he married again in 1995 and again divorced. His third wife, whom he married in 2007, is the novelist and philosopher Rebecca Goldstein. He has two stepdaughters, the novelist Yael Goldstein Love and the poet Danielle Blau. Pinker adopted atheism at 13, but at various times was a serious "cultural Jew." Pinker is an avid cyclist.

Linguistic career

Pinker's research on visual cognition, begun in collaboration with his thesis adviser, Stephen Kosslyn, showed that mental images represent scenes and objects as they appear from a specific vantage point (rather than capturing their intrinsic three-dimensional structure), and thus correspond to the neuroscientist David Marr's theory of a "two-and-a-half-dimensional sketch."  He also showed that this level of representation is used in visual attention, and in object recognition (at least for asymmetrical shapes), contrary to Marr's theory that recognition uses viewpoint-independent representations.

In psycholinguistics, Pinker became known early in his career for promoting computational learning theory as a way to understand language acquisition in children. He wrote a tutorial review of the field followed by two books that advanced his own theory of language acquisition, and a series of experiments on how children acquire the passive, dative, and locative constructions. These books were Language Learnability and Language Development (1984), in Pinker's words "outlin[ing] a theory of how children acquire the words and grammatical structures of their mother tongue", and Learnability and Cognition: The Acquisition of Argument Structure (1989), in Pinker's words "focus[ing] on one aspect of this process, the ability to use different kinds of verbs in appropriate sentences, such as intransitive verbs, transitive verbs, and verbs taking different combinations of complements and indirect objects". He then focused on verbs of two kinds that illustrate what he considers to be the processes required for human language: retrieving whole words from memory, like the past form of the irregular verb "bring", namely "brought"; and using rules to combine (parts of) words, like the past form of the regular verb "walk", namely "walked".

In 1988 Pinker and Alan Prince published a critique of a connectionist model of the acquisition of the past tense (a textbook problem in language acquisition), followed by a series of studies of how people use and acquire the past tense. This included a monograph on children's regularization of irregular forms and his popular 1999 book, Words and Rules: The Ingredients of Language. Pinker argued that language depends on two things: the associative remembering of sounds and their meanings in words, and the use of rules to manipulate symbols for grammar. He presented evidence against connectionism, where a child would have to learn all forms of all words and would simply retrieve each needed form from memory, in favour of the older alternative theory, the use of words and rules combined by generative phonology. He showed that mistakes made by children indicate the use of default rules to add suffixes such as "-ed": for instance 'breaked' and 'comed' for 'broke' and 'came'. He argued that this shows that irregular verb-forms in English have to be learnt and retrieved from memory individually, and that the children making these errors were predicting the regular "-ed" ending in an open-ended way by applying a mental rule. This rule for combining verb stems and the usual suffix can be expressed as Vpast → Vstem + d, where V is a verb and d is the regular ending. Pinker further argued that since the ten most frequently occurring English verbs (be, have, do, say, make ... ) are all irregular, while 98.2% of the thousand least common verbs are regular, there is a "massive correlation" of frequency and irregularity. He explains this by arguing that every irregular form, such as 'took', 'came' and 'got', has to be committed to memory by the children in each generation, or else lost, and that the common forms are the most easily memorized. Any irregular verb that falls in popularity past a certain point is lost, and all future generations will treat it as a regular verb instead.

In 1990 Pinker, with Paul Bloom, published a paper arguing that the human language faculty must have evolved through natural selection. The article provided arguments for a continuity-based view of language evolution, contrary to then-current discontinuity-based theories that see language as suddenly appearing with the advent of Homo sapiens as a kind of evolutionary accident. This discontinuity-based view was prominently argued by two main authorities, linguist Noam Chomsky and Stephen Jay Gould. The paper became widely cited and created renewed interest in the evolutionary prehistory of language, and has been credited with shifting the central question of the debate from "did language evolve?" to "how did language evolve?" The article also presaged Pinker's argument in The Language Instinct.

In 2006 Pinker provided to Alan Dershowitz, a personal friend of Pinker's who was Jeffrey Epstein's defense attorney, Pinker's own interpretation of the wording of a federal law pertaining to the enticement of minors into illegal sex acts via the internet. Dershowitz included Pinker's opinion in a letter to the court during proceedings that resulted in a plea deal in which all federal sex trafficking charges against Epstein were dropped. In 2019, Pinker stated that he was unaware of the nature of the charges against Epstein, and that he engaged in an unpaid favor for his Harvard colleague Dershowitz, as he had regularly done. He stated in a Buzzfeed interview that he regrets writing the letter. Pinker says he never received money from Epstein and met with him three times over more than a dozen years, and said he could never stand Epstein and tried to keep his distance.

Popularization of science

Human cognition and natural language

Pinker's 1994 The Language Instinct was the first of several books to combine cognitive science with behavioral genetics and evolutionary psychology. It introduces the science of language and popularizes Noam Chomsky's theory that language is an innate faculty of mind, with the controversial twist that the faculty for language evolved by natural selection as an adaptation for communication. Pinker criticizes several widely held ideas about language – that it needs to be taught, that people's grammar is poor and getting worse with new ways of speaking, the Sapir–Whorf hypothesis that language limits the kinds of thoughts a person can have, and that other great apes can learn languages. Pinker sees language as unique to humans, evolved to solve the specific problem of communication among social hunter-gatherers. He argues that it is as much an instinct as specialized adaptative behavior in other species, such as a spider's web-weaving or a beaver's dam-building.

Pinker states in his introduction that his ideas are "deeply influenced" by Chomsky; he also lists scientists whom Chomsky influenced to "open up whole new areas of language study, from child development and speech perception to neurology and genetics" – Eric Lenneberg, George Miller, Roger Brown, Morris Halle and Alvin Liberman. Brown mentored Pinker through his thesis; Pinker stated that Brown's "funny and instructive" book Words and Things (1958) was one of the inspirations for The Language Instinct.

There has been debate about the explanatory adequacy of the theory. By 2015, the nativist views of Pinker and Chomsky had a number of challenges on the grounds that they had incorrect core assumptions and were inconsistent with research evidence from psycholinguistics and child language acquisition. The reality of Pinker's proposed language instinct, and the related claim that grammar is innate and genetically based, has been contested by linguists such as Geoffrey Sampson in his 1997 book, Educating Eve: The 'Language Instinct' Debate. Sampson argues that "while it may seem attractive to argue the nature side of the 'nature versus nurture' debate, the nurture side may better support the creativity and nobility of the human mind." Sampson denies there is a language instinct, and argues that children can learn language because people can learn anything. Others have sought a middle ground between Pinker's nativism and Sampson's culturalism.

The assumptions underlying the nativist view have also been questioned in Jeffrey Elman's Rethinking Innateness: A Connectionist Perspective on Development, which defends the connectionist approach that Pinker attacked. In his 1996 book Impossible Minds, the machine intelligence researcher Igor Aleksander calls The Language Instinct excellent, and argues that Pinker presents a relatively soft claim for innatism, accompanied by a strong dislike of the 'Standard Social Sciences Model' or SSSM (Pinker's term), which supposes that development is purely dependent on culture. Further, Aleksander writes that while Pinker criticises some attempts to explain language processing with neural nets, Pinker later makes use of a neural net to create past tense verb forms correctly. Aleksander concludes that while he doesn't support the SSSM, "a cultural repository of language just seems the easy trick for an efficient evolutionary system armed with an iconic state machine to play."

Two other books, How the Mind Works (1997) and The Blank Slate (2002), broadly surveyed the mind and defended the idea of a complex human nature with many mental faculties that are genetically adaptive (Pinker is an ally of Daniel Dennett and Richard Dawkins in many disputes surrounding adaptationism). Another major theme in Pinker's theories is that human cognition works, in part, by combinatorial symbol-manipulation, not just associations among sensory features, as in many connectionist models. On the debate around The Blank Slate, Pinker called Thomas Sowell's book A Conflict of Visions "wonderful", and explained that "The Tragic Vision" and the "Utopian Vision" are the views of human nature behind right- and left-wing ideologies.

In Words and Rules: the Ingredients of Language (1999), Pinker argues from his own research that regular and irregular phenomena are products of computation and memory lookup, respectively, and that language can be understood as an interaction between the two. "Words and Rules" is also the title of an essay by Pinker outlining many of the topics discussed in the book. Critiqueing the book from the perspective of generative linguistics Charles Yang, in the London Review of Books, writes that "this book never runs low on hubris or hyperbole". The book's topic, the English past tense, is in Yang's view unglamorous, and Pinker's attempts at compromise risk being in no man's land between rival theories. Giving the example of German, Yang argues that irregular nouns in that language at least all belong to classes, governed by rules, and that things get even worse in languages that attach prefixes and suffixes to make up long 'words': they can't be learnt individually, as there are untold numbers of combinations. "All Pinker (and the connectionists) are doing is turning over the rocks at the base of the intellectual landslide caused by the Chomskian revolution."

In The Stuff of Thought (2007), Pinker looks at a wide range of issues around the way words related to thoughts on the one hand, and to the world outside ourselves on the other. Given his evolutionary perspective, a central question is how an intelligent mind capable of abstract thought evolved: how a mind adapted to Stone Age life could work in the modern world. Many quirks of language are the result.

Pinker is critical of theories about the evolutionary origins of language that argue that linguistic cognition might have evolved from earlier musical cognition. He sees language as being tied primarily to the capacity for logical reasoning, and speculates that human proclivity for music may be a spandrel – a feature not adaptive in its own right, but that has persisted through other traits that are more broadly practical, and thus selected for. In How the Mind Works, Pinker reiterates Immanuel Kant's view that music is not in itself an important cognitive phenomenon, but that it happens to stimulate important auditory and spatio-motor cognitive functions. Pinker compares music to "auditory cheesecake", stating that "As far as biological cause and effect is concerned, music is useless". This argument has been rejected by Daniel Levitin and Joseph Carroll, experts in music cognition, who argue that music has had an important role in the evolution of human cognition. In his book This Is Your Brain On Music, Levitin argues that music could provide adaptive advantage through sexual selection, social bonding, and cognitive development; he questions the assumption that music is the antecedent to language, as opposed to its progenitor, noting that many species display music-like habits that could be seen as precursors to human music.

Pinker has also been critical of "whole language" reading instruction techniques, stating in How the Mind Works, "...the dominant technique, called 'whole language,' the insight that [spoken] language is a naturally developing human instinct has been garbled into the evolutionarily improbable claim that reading is a naturally developing human instinct." In the appendix to the 2007 reprinted edition of The Language Instinct, Pinker cited Why Our Children Can't Read by cognitive psychologist Diane McGuinness as his favorite book on the subject and noted:

One raging public debate involving language went unmentioned in The Language Instinct: the "reading wars," or dispute over whether children should be explicitly taught to read by decoding the sounds of words from their spelling (loosely known as "phonics") or whether they can develop it instinctively by being immersed in a text-rich environment (often called "whole language"). I tipped my hand in the paragraph in [the sixth chapter of the book] which said that language is an instinct but reading is not. Like most psycholinguists (but apparently unlike many school boards), I think it's essential for children to be taught to become aware of speech sounds and how they are coded in strings of letters.

The Better Angels of Our Nature

In The Better Angels of Our Nature, published in 2011, Pinker argues that violence, including tribal warfare, homicide, cruel punishments, child abuse, animal cruelty, domestic violence, lynching, pogroms, and international and civil wars, has decreased over multiple scales of time and magnitude. Pinker considers it unlikely that human nature has changed. In his view, it is more likely that human nature comprises inclinations toward violence and those that counteract them, the "better angels of our nature". He outlines several "major historical declines of violence" that all have their own socio/cultural/economic causes.

Response to the book was divided. Many critics found its arguments convincing and its synthesis of a large volume of historical evidence compelling. Other aspects drew criticism, including the use of deaths per capita as a metric, Pinker's liberal humanism, the focus on Europe, the interpretation of historical data, and its image of indigenous people. Archaeologist David Wengrow summarized Pinker's approach to archaeological science as "a modern psychologist making it up as he goes along".

English writing style in the 21st century

In his seventh popular book, The Sense of Style: The Thinking Person's Guide to Writing in the 21st Century (2014), Pinker attempts to provide a writing style guide that is informed by modern science and psychology, because a long time has passed since William Strunk wrote The Elements of Style in 1918.

Public debate

Pinker is a frequent participant in public debates surrounding the contributions of science to contemporary society. Social commentators such as Ed West, author of The Diversity Illusion, consider Pinker important and daring in his willingness to confront taboos, as in The Blank Slate. According to West, the doctrine of tabula rasa remained accepted "as fact, rather than fantasy" a decade after the book's publication. West describes Pinker as "no polemicist, and he leaves readers to draw their own conclusions".

In January 2005 Pinker defended comments by then-President of Harvard University Lawrence Summers. Summers had speculated that in addition to differing societal demands and discrimination, "different availability of aptitude at the high end" may contribute to gender gaps in mathematics and science. In a debate between Pinker and Elizabeth Spelke on gender and science, Pinker argued in favor of the proposition that the gender difference in representation in elite universities was "explainable by some combination of biological differences in average temperaments and talents interacting with socialization and bias".

In January 2009 Pinker wrote an article about the Personal Genome Project and its possible impact on the understanding of human nature in The New York Times. He discussed the new developments in epigenetics and gene-environment interactions in the afterword to the 2016 edition of his book The Blank Slate.

In a November 2009 article for The New York Times Pinker wrote a mixed review of Malcolm Gladwell's essays, criticizing his analytical methods. Gladwell replied, disputing Pinker's comments about the importance of IQ on teaching performance and by analogy the effect, if any, of draft order on quarterback performance in the National Football League. Advanced NFL Stats addressed the issue statistically, siding with Pinker and showing that differences in methodology could explain the two men's differing opinions.

In an appearance for BBC World Service's "Exchanges At The Frontier" programme, an audience member questioned whether the virtuous developments in culture and human nature (documented in The Better Angels of Our Nature) could have expressed in our biology either through genetic or epigenetic expression. Pinker responded that it was unlikely since "some of the declines have occurred far too rapidly for them to be explicable by biological evolution which has a speed limit measured in generations, but crime can plummet in a span of 15 years and some of these humanitarian reforms like eliminating slavery and torture occurred in say 50 years". Helga Vierich and Cathryn Townsend wrote a critical review of Pinker's sweeping "civilizational" explanations for patterns of human violence and warfare in response to a lecture he gave at Cambridge University in September 2015.

In his 2018 book Enlightenment Now, Pinker posited that Enlightenment rationality should be defended against attacks from both the political left and political right. In a debate with Pinker, post-colonial theorist Homi Bhabha said that Enlightenment philosophy had immoral consequences such as inequality, slavery, imperialism, world wars, and genocide, and that Pinker downplayed them. Pinker argued that Bhabha had perceived the causal relationship between Enlightenment thinking and these sources of suffering "backwards", responding in part that "The natural state of humanity, at least since the dawn of civilization, is poverty, disease, ignorance, exploitation, and violence (including slavery and imperial conquest). It is knowledge, mobilised to improve human welfare, that allows anyone to rise above this state."

In 2020, an open letter to the Linguistic Society of America requesting the removal of Pinker from its list of LSA Fellows and its list of media experts was signed by hundreds of academics. The letter accused Pinker of a "pattern of drowning out the voices of people suffering from racist and sexist violence, in particular in the immediate aftermath of violent acts and/or protests against the systems that created them," citing as examples six tweets and a phrase used in his 2011 book.  Pinker said that through this letter he, and more importantly, younger academics with less protection, were being threatened by "a regime of intimidation that constricts the theatre of ideas." Several academics criticized the letter and expressed strong support for Pinker. Conor Friedersdorf, writing in The Atlantic, said the letter engages in guilt by association and for creating a "chilling effect" on the speech of non-tenured academics. The executive committee of the Linguistic Society of America declined to strike Pinker from its lists and issued a response letter stating that the group "is committed to intellectual freedom and professional responsibility. It is not the mission of the Society to control the opinions of its members, nor their expression. Inclusion and civility are crucial to productive scholarly work. And inclusion means hearing (not necessarily accepting) all points of view, even those that may be objectionable to some."

Awards and distinctions 

Pinker was named one of Time's 100 most influential people in the world in 2004  and one of Prospect and Foreign Policys 100 top public intellectuals in both years the poll was carried out, 2005 and 2008; in 2010 and 2011 he was named by Foreign Policy to its list of top global thinkers. In 2016, he was elected to the National Academy of Sciences.

His research in cognitive psychology has won the Early Career Award (1984) and Boyd McCandless Award (1986) from the American Psychological Association, the Troland Research Award (1993) from the National Academy of Sciences, the Henry Dale Prize (2004) from the Royal Institution of Great Britain, and the George Miller Prize (2010) from the Cognitive Neuroscience Society. He has also received honorary doctorates from the universities of Newcastle, Surrey, Tel Aviv, McGill, Simon Fraser University and the University of Tromsø. He was twice a finalist for the Pulitzer Prize, in 1998 and in 2003. Pinker received the Golden Plate Award of the American Academy of Achievement in 1999. On May 13, 2006, he received the American Humanist Association's Humanist of the Year award for his contributions to public understanding of human evolution. For 2022 he was awarded the BBVA Foundation Frontiers of Knowledge Award in the category of "Humanities and Social Sciences".

Pinker has served on the editorial boards of journals such as Cognition, Daedalus, and PLOS One, and on the advisory boards of institutions for scientific research (e.g., the Allen Institute for Brain Science), free speech (e.g., the Foundation for Individual Rights in Education), the popularization of science (e.g., the World Science Festival and the Committee for Skeptical Inquiry), peace (e.g., the Peace Research Endowment), and secular humanism (e.g., the Freedom From Religion Foundation and the Secular Coalition for America).

From 2008 to 2018, Pinker chaired the Usage Panel of the American Heritage Dictionary. He wrote the essay on usage for the fifth edition of the Dictionary, published in 2011.

In February 2001, Pinker, "whose hair has long been the object of admiration, and envy, and intense study", was nominated by acclamation as the first member of the Luxuriant Flowing Hair Club for Scientists (LFHCfS) organized by the Annals of Improbable Research.

Bibliography

Books

 Language Learnability and Language Development (1984)
 Visual Cognition (1985)
 Connections and Symbols (1988)
 Learnability and Cognition: The Acquisition of Argument Structure (1989)
 Lexical and Conceptual Semantics (1992)
 The Language Instinct: How the Mind Creates Language (1994)
 How the Mind Works (1997)
 Words and Rules: The Ingredients of Language (1999)
 The Blank Slate: The Modern Denial of Human Nature (2002)
 The Best American Science and Nature Writing (editor and introduction author, 2004)
 Hotheads (an extract from How the Mind Works, 2005) 
 The Stuff of Thought: Language as a Window into Human Nature (2007)
 The Seven Words You Can't Say on Television (2008)
 The Better Angels of Our Nature: Why Violence Has Declined (2011)
 Language, Cognition, and Human Nature: Selected Articles (2013)
 The Sense of Style: The Thinking Person's Guide to Writing in the 21st Century (September 30, 2014)
 Enlightenment Now: The Case for Reason, Science, Humanism, and Progress (February 13, 2018)
 Rationality: What It Is, Why It Seems Scarce, Why It Matters (September 28, 2021)

References

External links

 
 
 Selective compilation of articles and other works, hosted at Harvard faculty pages

Interviews 
 7th Avenue interview on "Better Angels", 2014
 Steven Pinker on The Hour
 Steven Pinker Multimedia audio and video files
 Mosaic Science (Wellcome) interview

Filmed talks 
 
 The Better Angels of our Nature , Royal Institution, November 2011
 Linguistics, Style and Writing in the 21st Century: With Steven Pinker , Royal Institution, October 2015
 Q&A – Linguistics, style and writing with Steven Pinker , Royal Institution, October 2015
 Steven Pinker & Michael Shermer, Pangburn, September 2018

Debates 
 The Two Steves Debate with neurobiologist Steven Rose
 The Science of Gender and Science Debate with cognitive psychologist Elizabeth Spelke (Video of the debate on YouTube)
 The Decline of Violence Debate with economist Judith Marquand, BHA chief executive Andrew Copson and BBC broadcaster Roger Bolton

1954 births
Living people
20th-century atheists
21st-century atheists
20th-century American philosophers
20th-century Canadian scientists
21st-century American philosophers
21st-century Canadian scientists
Academics from Montreal
Jewish American atheists
American feminists
American humanists
Linguists from the United States
American cognitive psychologists
American people of Moldovan-Jewish descent
American people of Polish-Jewish descent
American science writers
American skeptics
Anglophone Quebec people
Canadian atheists
Canadian emigrants to the United States
Canadian feminists
Canadian humanists
Linguists from Canada
Canadian people of Polish-Jewish descent
Canadian people of Romanian-Jewish descent
Canadian philosophers
Canadian psychologists
Canadian science writers
Canadian skeptics
Critics of postmodernism
Dawson College alumni
Developmental psycholinguists
Evolutionary psychologists
Experimental psychologists
Fellows of the Cognitive Science Society
Fellows of the Linguistic Society of America
Harvard University alumni
Harvard University faculty
Jewish American social scientists
Jewish American academics
Jewish Canadian writers
Jewish feminists
Male feminists
Massachusetts Institute of Technology School of Science faculty
McGill University Faculty of Science alumni
Members of the United States National Academy of Sciences
Philosophers of language
Philosophers of mind
Scientists from Montreal
Stanford University Department of Psychology faculty
Writers from Montreal